Witches' Night (Swedish: Häxnatten) is a 1937 Swedish drama film directed by Schamyl Bauman and starring Gösta Ekman, Signe Hasso and  Ruth Stevens. The film's sets were designed by the Austrian art director Erwin Scharf.

Synopsis
A teacher and poet is much lamented when he leaves a school to get married, particularly one of the students Majken. Five years later she encounters him again.

Cast
 Gösta Ekman as 	Arne Markell
 Signe Hasso as Majken Celsing
 Ruth Stevens as 	Lena Markell
 Göran Bernhard as 	Gunnar Markell
 Sture Lagerwall as 	Balalajkan
 Einar Axelsson as Bengt Arktander
 Eric Abrahamsson as 	Mr. Olsson
 Gerda Björne as 	Mrs. Olsson
 Märtha Lindlöf as 	Grandmother
 Aurore Palmgren as 	Sidonia
 Margareta Bergfeldt as 	Anna
 Kurt Björkvall as 	Self 
 John Botvid as Prison guard 
 Märta Dorff as Student 
 Gustaf Färingborg as Journalist 
 Sigge Fürst as 	Policeman 
 Mona Geijer-Falkner as 	Cleaning lady 
 Torsten Hillberg as Night porter 
 Axel Högel as Prison guard 
 Nils Johannisson as 	Sörenson
 Saga Sjöberg as 	Student 
 Inga-Lill Åhström as 	Greta

References

Bibliography 
 Gustafsson, Fredrik. The Man from the Third Row: Hasse Ekman, Swedish Cinema and the Long Shadow of Ingmar Bergman. Berghahn Books, 2016.

External links 
 

1937 films
Swedish drama films
1937 drama films
1930s Swedish-language films
Films directed by Schamyl Bauman
Films set in Stockholm
1930s Swedish films